The 2021 Caribbean Premier League (CPLT20) or for sponsorship reasons, Hero CPL 2021 was the ninth season of the Caribbean Premier League, the domestic Twenty20 cricket league that was played in the West Indies. The tournament was held from 26 August to 15 September 2021, with all the matches took placed in Saint Kitts and Nevis. A players' draft was held on 28 May 2021. On 14 July 2021, Cricket West Indies confirmed the fixtures for the tournament. The Trinbago Knight Riders were the defending champions.

Prior to the start of the tournament, two of the franchise teams were renamed. The Barbados Tridents became the Barbados Royals, and the St Lucia Zouks became the Saint Lucia Kings.

In the final, the St Kitts & Nevis Patriots beat the Saint Lucia Kings by three wickets to win their first CPL title.

Squads
The following players were named for the tournament:

Venue

Points table

  Advance to the Playoffs

League stage

Playoffs

Semi-final 1

Semi-final 2

Final

Statistics

Most runs

Most wickets

References

External links
 Series home at ESPN Cricinfo

Caribbean Premier League
Caribbean Premier League